The American Ceramic Society (ACerS) is a non-profit professional organization for the ceramics community, with a focus on scientific research, emerging technologies, and applications in which ceramic materials are an element. It is located in Westerville, Ohio.

It comprises more than 11,000 members from 70 countries, with membership including engineers, scientists, researchers, manufacturers, plant personnel, educators, students, and marketing and sales representatives.

History
ACerS was founded in 1899 by nine members of the National Brick Manufacturer's Association.  The previous year at the association's annual convention in Pittsburgh, Elmer E. Gorton of American Terra Cotta & Ceramic Co. presented a paper entitled “Experimental Work, Wise and Otherwise." This paper was significant for being the first presented at the convention with a scientific focus, and motivated the formation of a non-commercial society dedicated to the exchange of ideas and research on the science of ceramics.  The American Ceramic Society was officially formed on February 6, 1899, at its first annual meeting, which was held in Columbus, OhioACerS History.

Organization
ACerS is organized into the following twelve divisions The American Ceramic Society:
Art, Archaeology and Conservation Science. advances the scientific understanding of the materials found in ceramic art, and provides information that aids in the interpretation, reconstruction and preservation of traditional ceramic art and artifacts, as well as the techniques used in their creation artistic purposes.
Basic Science is concerned with studying the chemistry and physics of ceramics.
Bioceramics is dedicated to stimulate the growth and activity of the Society, particularly in the areas of the science, engineering, and manufacturing of bioceramics, biocomposites, and biomaterials.
Cements centers on the development and manufacture of cements, limes, and plasters.
Electronics examines ceramic materials for use in electronic devices.
Energy Materials and Systems deals with the science and engineering of ceramic and glass materials and related technologies, as they apply to the harvesting, conversion, storage, transport and utilization of energy.
Engineering Ceramics deals with the use of ceramics and their composites as structural and mechanical components.
Glass & Optical Materials centers on the design, manufacture and use of glasses.
Manufacturing focuses on meeting the broader needs of today's manufacturers who produce or use ceramic and glass materials, including the entire supply chain. In addition to enhancing networking opportunities, it addresses new manufacturing processes and techniques, sustainability, and business and environmental issues.
Nuclear & Environmental Technology concentrates on the use of ceramics in nuclear energy production and medicine.
Refractory Ceramics explores ceramics for use in high temperature and other hostile environments.
Structural Clay Products is concerned with the manufacture of brick, pipe, and red-body tile.

Classes

Keramos
Keramos was founded by ACerS in 1902 as a professional fraternity of ceramic engineering.  It has active chapters at University of Arizona,
University of Florida, Georgia Institute of Technology, University of Illinois at Urbana-Champaign, Iowa State University, Missouri University of Science and Technology, Rutgers University, New York State College of Ceramics, Ohio State University, Pennsylvania State University,  Clemson University, and University of WashingtonKeramos.

National Institute of Ceramic Engineers
The National Institute of Ceramic Engineers (NICE) works with ABET to accredit collegiate programs in ceramics.  Materials science and engineering programs that offer an option to specialize in ceramics are accredited by NICE in conjunction with TMS.  NICE is also responsible for writing and administering the Principles and Practice of Engineering Exam in ceramics engineering.

Ceramic Educational Council
The Ceramic Educational Council was founded in 1938 with the goal of improving ceramics education. Councils & Classes.

See also
Journal of the American Ceramic Society

References

External links
 American Ceramic Society website

 
Ceramic engineering
Ceramic materials
Glass engineering and science